The Jamaican honours system has developed as a unique entity since the passage of the National Honours and Awards Act by the Parliament of Jamaica in 1969 (Act No. 21 of 1969). The system is modelled largely on the British honours system, which was formerly conferred on Jamaicans. 

The Governor-General is the Chancellor of each order, membership of which is conferred by the Governor-General upon the advice of the Prime Minister of Jamaica.  The sovereign is not, however, the sovereign of these orders, as in the case of the Order of Canada and the Order of Australia.  In a sense, therefore, they are somewhat analogous to those distinctions awarded by certain of the Canadian provinces. 

Most Jamaican honours allow recipients to place post-nominal letters after their names, and some honours include pre-nominal styles.

Honours

The honours in this Jamaican system are as follows, from highest to lowest in rank:

In exercise of the royal prerogative, Charles III, as King of Jamaica, awards the Order of St Michael and St George (GCMG) to the incumbent Governor-General of Jamaica. This, however, is mainly ceremonial. No other British/Commonwealth honour is awarded in Jamaica, but, they are able to be awarded with advice given to the King of Jamaica, via the incumbent Prime Minister of Jamaica with approval from the Cabinet of Jamaica.

Medals

Awards

References

External links

"Jamaica's Honours", Jamaica Observer, 7 August 2012, retrieved 7 August 2012

Jamaica and the Commonwealth of Nations